The 1985 Philippine Basketball Association (PBA) Open Conference was the first conference of the 1985 PBA season. It started on March 3 and ended on May 30, 1985. The tournament is an Import-laden format, which requires an import or a pure-foreign player for each team.

Format
The following format will be observed for the duration of the conference:
 Double-round robin eliminations; 12 games per team; Teams are then seeded by basis on win–loss records.
 Team with the worst record after the elimination round will be eliminated. The top two teams will advance outright to the semifinals. 
 The next four teams will qualify to the single round robin quarterfinals. Results from the eliminations will be carried over. The top two teams will advance to the semifinals. 
 Semifinals will be a double round robin affair with the four remaining teams. The top two teams in the semifinals advance to the best-of-seven finals. The last two teams dispute the third-place trophy in a best-of-seven series.

Elimination round

Quarterfinals

Semifinal berth playoff

Semifinals

Third place playoffs

Finals

References

PBA Open Conference
Open Conference